Welsh Harp may refer to:

 Welsh triple harp or triple harp, a traditional musical instrument
 Welsh Harp (ward), an electoral ward of the Brent London Borough Council
 Welsh Harp railway station, London 1870–1903
 Brent Reservoir or Welsh Harp, London